is a Japanese footballer who plays for Albirex Niigata.

Club statistics
Updated to 23 February 2021.

References

External links
Profile at V-Varen Nagasaki

1990 births
Living people
Waseda University alumni
Association football people from Ibaraki Prefecture
Japanese footballers
J1 League players
J2 League players
Fagiano Okayama players
V-Varen Nagasaki players
Albirex Niigata players
Association football midfielders